Ravee Intaporn-udom (born 14 August 1980) is a Thai swimmer. She represented Thailand at the SEA Games from 1993 to 2001, winning 17 gold medals, and competed twice at the Asian Games and in three events at the 1996 Summer Olympics. She now operates a children's swimming school.

References

1980 births
Living people
Ravee Intaporn-udom
Ravee Intaporn-udom
Ravee Intaporn-udom
Swimmers at the 1996 Summer Olympics
Place of birth missing (living people)